

Medalists

Heats

Semifinals

Final

60 metres at the World Athletics Indoor Championships
60 metres Women
2008 in women's athletics